The Eastern Iowa League was a minor league baseball league that played in the 1890 and 1895 seasons. The eight–team Independent level Eastern Iowa League consisted of teams based in Iowa and Illinois. The Eastern Iowa League permanently folded following the 1895 season.

History
The Eastern Iowa League was formed for the 1895 season as an Independent level minor league. A league with the same name had operated in 1890 and the teams and statistics of the 1890 league are unknown. The Eastern Iowa League League began play on May 10, 1895, as an eight–team league. The Eastern Iowa League League hosted Iowa franchises from Burlington, Iowa (Burlington Spiders), Cedar Rapids, Iowa (Cedar Rapids Rabbits), Clinton, Iowa (Clinton Bridegrooms), Dubuque, Iowa (Dubuque Colts), Ottumwa, Iowa (Ottumwa Brownies) and Waterloo, Iowa (Waterloo Indians). The Illinois franchises were based in Rock Island, Illinois (Rock Island Tri-Cities) and Galesburg, Illinois (Galesburg Trotters).

After the season began in 1895, two franchises were "expelled" from the league. On June 14, 1895, both the Clinton Bridegrooms and the Rock Island Tri-Cities were expelled from the Eastern Iowa League.

Cedar Rapids turned a triple play in a 6–2 victory over Dubuque on June 18, 1895.

The Galesburg Trotters franchise disbanded on June 25, 1895, and did not return to league play.

After being expelled from the league, the Clinton Bridegrooms were allowed to rejoin the Eastern Iowa League, returning to league play on July 4, 1895.

On July 8, 1895, four days after being reinstated, the Clinton Bridegrooms were expelled from the league for a second time. The Waterloo Indians were also expelled from the Eastern Iowa League on July 8, 1895.

The Dubuque Colts franchise explored joining the Western Association in 1895 and one of the Dubuque directors of the Dubuque club wrote a letter to the Cedar Rapids franchise in an attempt to have Cedar Rapids join them in the move. The teams did not leave the 1895 Eastern Iowa League.

Local businesses regularly closed when Eastern Iowa League teams hosted home games.

The Dubuque Colts (66–31) had the best overall record in the Eastern Iowa League, which ended the season with four teams. Dubuque won the Eastern Iowa League Championship by winning both halves, so no playoffs were held. The rest of the Eastern Iowa League 1895 regular season records were: Burlington Spiders (52–39), Ottumwa Brownies (49–52), Cedar Rapids Rabbits (43–51). The four teams who were didn't finish the season were the Waterloo Indians, who stopped play with a 21–25 record, the Rock Island Tri-Cities (14–18), Galesburg Trotters (13–27) and Clinton Bridegrooms (11–26).

The Eastern Iowa League permanently disbanded after the 1895 season was completed.

Eastern Iowa League teams: 1895

Standings & statistics
1895 Eastern Iowa League

References

Defunct minor baseball leagues in the United States
Baseball leagues in Iowa
Defunct professional sports leagues in the United States
Baseball leagues in Illinois
Sports leagues established in 1895
Sports leagues disestablished in 1895